Prawer is a surname. Notable people with the surname include:
 Joshua Prawer (1917–1990), Israeli historian
 Ruth Prawer Jhabvala (1927–2013), German-born British and American author and screenwriter
 Siegbert Salomon Prawer (1925–2012), German-born British professor of German literature at Oxford

Jewish surnames
Germanic-language surnames